Philip and Uriah Arter Farm is a historic home and farm complex located at Union Mills, Carroll County, Maryland.  The complex includes a frame house built about 1844, a frame bank barn built about 1888, and a deteriorated early-20th-century frame outbuilding.  The house is a well-preserved example of a middling farmer's dwelling house from mid-19th-century Maryland.

It was listed on the National Register of Historic Places in 2006.

References

External links
, including photo in 2003, at Maryland Historical Trust

Houses on the National Register of Historic Places in Maryland
Houses in Carroll County, Maryland
Houses completed in 1844
Union Mills, Maryland
National Register of Historic Places in Carroll County, Maryland